Daria Mullakaeva (born 18 June 1998) is a Russian swimmer. She competed in the women's 4 × 200 metre freestyle relay event at the 2016 Summer Olympics.

References

External links
 

1998 births
Living people
Olympic swimmers of Russia
Swimmers at the 2016 Summer Olympics
Sportspeople from Perm, Russia
Swimmers at the 2014 Summer Youth Olympics
Medalists at the FINA World Swimming Championships (25 m)
Russian female freestyle swimmers